Télévision Malagasy (TVM) is the national broadcaster of Madagascar, established in 1967. To achieve national dissemination of programmes across Madagascar, the channels broadcast on the EutelSat satellite at 16° East. Likewise it is also used for the diffusion of Radio Madagascar on the radio FM at 99.00Mhz. One of its former names was "Radio Television Malagasy", that name lasted until the 1990s.

Broadcasts started on 24 December 1967 through a station located in Antananarivo, and over the next years repeaters were installed on Ambatolampy, Antananarivo-East and Arivonimamo. On 28 December 1974 a new TV station opened on Antsiranana (then-called as Diego Suárez).

References

Television in Madagascar
Television channels and stations established in 1965